Gilman is a village in Taylor County, Wisconsin, United States. The population was 410 at the 2010 census. The village is located between the towns of Aurora and Ford.

Geography
The community is in southwest Taylor County adjacent to the intersection of highways 64 and 73. The Chequamegon–Nicolet National Forest lies three miles to the east.

History
Gilman was not settled until 1902 or 1903, though people had settled along the Yellow River in the west end of what is now the town of Aurora by 1900.   The article on Aurora contains a description of the area from 1854, before logging or settlers.  By 1880 a "Winter Road" followed the Yellow River through the vicinity of what would become Gilman, heading for logging operations further up the Yellow.

In 1902 and 1903 the Stanley, Merrill and Phillips Railway crossed the Yellow River into the woods that would become Gilman, heading for Jump River and beyond. It built a section house where the line crossed the river and named the stop for Sally Gilman, the wife of the president of the Northwestern Lumber Company.  That was the start of Gilman. The SM&P ran generally north through town, passing just east of the current school. Around 1905, the Wisconsin Central Railway built its line northwest through town, heading from Owen to Ladysmith and eventually Superior. This line later became the Soo Line Railroad and eventually the Canadian National Railway line which still runs through town.

The village grew fast. A school was started in 1904 and the village was platted in 1905. Hotels, saloons, a general store, a barber and a post office soon followed. In 1907 Roy Heagle and others started a stave and heading mill called Gilman Manufacturing Company on the south side of town near the river. It made barrels from local basswood and by 1912 it employed as many as sixty men. During World War I the mill ran around the clock making barrels for ammunition. This mill operated until 1935. Heagle also ran a planing mill and a lath mill in Gilman.

Gilman was incorporated as a village in 1914. In 1915 three gas lights lit the streets at night - the only street lights between Owen and Ladysmith at the time. That same year the Catholic Church was organized. Other denominations followed shortly. A high school started in 1917. A fire destroyed much of Gilman's business district in 1922, but it rebuilt.

During the same period, the village of Polley had grown two miles to the south, also on the SM&P line. It had a school, a hotel-saloon, a general store, a forty-man sawmill, a barber, a cheese factory, a millinery shop, and a newspaper. But the SM&P shut down in the 1930s and Polley declined until today only a bar and some homes and farms remain, while Gilman survives.

In the 1950s a central high school was started at Gilman for all of western Taylor County. Since then the primary schools have been centralized there too.

Today Gilman is smaller than it once was, but it has a hardware store, a few cafes, a bank, and other services. Major employers in town are the school, the nursing home, and Gilman Cheese. The major events each year are the Fall Fest and Snieg (Polish for snow) Fest in February, which features snow sculpting and a frying pan toss.

Demographics

2010 census
As of the census of 2010, there were 410 people, 187 households, and 97 families residing in the village. The racial makeup of the village was 99.5% White, 0.2% from other races, and 0.2% from two or more races. Hispanic or Latino of any race were 0.5% of the population.

There were 187 households, of which 23.0% had children under the age of 18 living with them, 36.9% were married couples living together, 10.2% had a female householder with no husband present, 4.8% had a male householder with no wife present, and 48.1% were non-families. 43.3% of all households were made up of individuals, and 22.5% had someone living alone who was 65 years of age or older. The average household size was 2.06 and the average family size was 2.89.

The median age in the village was 47.8 years. 21.7% of residents were under the age of 18; 5.1% were between the ages of 18 and 24; 19.5% were from 25 to 44; 26.3% were from 45 to 64; and 27.3% were 65 years of age or older. The gender makeup of the village was 49.0% male and 51.0% female.

2000 census
As of the census of 2000, there were 474 people, 185 households, and 110 families residing in the village. The population density was 202.8 people per square mile (78.2/km2). There were 209 housing units at an average density of 89.4/sq mi (34.5/km2). The racial makeup of the village was 97.89% White, 0.42% Asian, 1.48% from other races, and 0.21% from two or more races. Hispanic or Latino of any race were 1.69% of the population.

There were 185 households, out of which 24.9% had children under the age of 18 living with them, 44.9% were married couples living together, 10.8% had a female householder with no husband present, and 40.5% were non-families. 36.8% of all households were made up of individuals, and 18.9% had someone living alone who was 65 years of age or older. The average household size was 2.26 and the average family size was 2.97.

In the village, the population was spread out, with 19.8% under the age of 18, 6.8% from 18 to 24, 24.3% from 25 to 44, 21.1% from 45 to 64, and 28.1% who were 65 years of age or older. The median age was 44 years. For every 100 females, there were 100.0 males. For every 100 females age 18 and over, there were 91.9 males.

The median income for a household in the village was $32,708, and the median income for a family was $50,833. Males had a median income of $29,875 versus $22,083 for females. The per capita income for the village was $18,075. About 7.8% of families and 14.0% of the population were below the poverty line, including 11.8% of those under age 18 and 30.8% of those age 65 or over.

Landmarks
 The historic Gilman swinging bridge is a landmark of the community

See also
 List of villages in Wisconsin

References

External links

 
 School district of Gilman

Villages in Taylor County, Wisconsin
Villages in Wisconsin